Thomas Vyner DD (died 11 April 1673) was a Canon of Windsor from 1670 to 1673.

Family
He was the son of William Vyner of Eathorpe, Warwickshire.

He died in 1673 aged 44, and was buried in Gloucester Cathedral.

Career
He was educated at St Catharine's College, Cambridge and award BA in 1650, MA in 1653, BD in 1662 and DD in 1671.

He was appointed:
Rector of Stanton with Snowshill, 1652
Rural Dean of Campden
Rector of Paulersbury, Northamptonshire 1660 - 1663
Prebendary of Gloucester Cathedral 1665 - 1671
Rector of Bradwell by Sea, Essex 1667 - 1673
Archdeacon of Gloucester 1671 - 1673
Dean of Gloucester Cathedral 1671 - 1673
 
He was appointed to the ninth stall in St George's Chapel, Windsor Castle in 1670, a position he held until 1673.

Notes 

1673 deaths
Canons of Windsor
Alumni of St Catharine's College, Cambridge
Year of birth missing
Burials at Gloucester Cathedral